Ayawaso Central is one of the constituencies represented in the Parliament of Ghana. It is one of the six newly created assemblies and districts that was inaugurated by Government of Ghana across the nation, simultaneously. It elects one Member of Parliament (MP) by the first past the post system of election.

Members of Parliament

Elections

See also
List of Ghana Parliament constituencies
Ayawaso Central Municipal District

References 

Parliamentary constituencies in the Greater Accra Region